Bunkpurugu-Nyankpanduri District is one of the six districts in North East Region, Ghana. Originally it was formerly part of the then-larger Bunkpurugu-Yunyoo District on 19 August 2004, which was created from the former Mamprusi District Council, until the southern part of the district was split off to create Yunyoo-Nasuan District on 15 March 2018; thus the remaining part has been renamed as Bunkpurugu-Nyankpanduri District. The district assembly was located in the northeast part of Northern Region and had Bunkpurugu as its capital town.

References

North East Region, Ghana